Tarzan and the Huntress is a 1947 American adventure film starring Johnny Weissmuller in his eleventh outing as Tarzan.  Brenda Joyce makes the third of five appearances as Jane and Johnny Sheffield marks his eighth and final appearance as Boy.  Patricia Morison and Barton MacLane co-star.  The film was produced by Sol Lesser and Kurt Neumann, written by Jerry Gruskin and Rowland Leigh (based on characters created by Edgar Rice Burroughs) and directed by Kurt Neumann.  It was released on April 5, 1947.

Plot

Due to a shortage of animals in American zoos following World War II, Tanya Rawlins (Patricia Morison), a big-game "huntress," Carl Marley (John Warburton), her financial backer and Paul Weir (Barton MacLane), a cruel trail boss, are given permission by King Farrod (Charles Trowbridge), to capture a male and female of each species of animal on his land.

In a subplot, Oziri (Ted Hecht), nephew to King Farrod, colludes with Weir to allow him to trap more animals than bargained for.  He also has Weir's men kill King Farrod and his son, Prince Suli (Maurice Tauzin), in order for him to take over the throne.  Farrod is shot in the back and killed, and Suli is thrown into a pit full of crocodiles, but, unknown to all watching, he lands on a hidden ledge and is knocked unconscious.

Boy (Johnny Sheffield) trades two lion cubs to the trappers for a flashlight.  When Tarzan (Johnny Weissmuller) finds out, he returns the flashlight, retrieves the cubs, and calls all the animals from King Farrod's land across the river to his part of the jungle.  When the hunters begin trapping on his side of the river, Tarzan and Boy sneak into their camp at night, take their guns and hide them in a cave behind a waterfall.  They then begin to systematically release all the trapped animals from their cages.

Cheeta inadvertently reveals the location of the cache of weapons to Rawlins and her safari.

Prince Suli is able to make his way through the jungle, and is found by Tarzan.  Tarzan, Boy and a herd of elephants defeat both the usurping nephew and the huntress, but the latter escapes on board a plane.

Selected cast
 Johnny Weissmuller as Tarzan
 Brenda Joyce as Jane
 Johnny Sheffield as Boy
 Patricia Morison as Tanya Rawlins, unscrupulous big game huntress
 Barton MacLane as Paul Weir, villainous trail boss
 John Warburton as Carl Marley, backer of Rawlins' expedition
 Charles Trowbridge as King Farrod
 Ted Hecht as Prince Ozira
 Wallace Scott as 'Smitty' Smithers

Production notes
A character arc throughout the film is Boy's acceptance of adult responsibilities.  In one line of dialogue Tarzan says, "Boy man now."  Sheffield was sixteen when the film was released and producer Sol Lesser thought he had outgrown the role of a cute boy, so the character did not appear in further films.

References

Bibliography
 Essoe, Gabe. Tarzan of The Movies, 1968, published by The Citadel Press.

External links 

 
 
 
 ERBzine Silver Screen: Tarzan and the Huntress

1947 films
1940s fantasy adventure films
American fantasy adventure films
American sequel films
Films directed by Kurt Neumann
Tarzan films
Films produced by Sol Lesser
American black-and-white films
Films scored by Paul Sawtell
RKO Pictures films
1940s English-language films
1940s American films